The Lockport Formation is a geologic formation in Ontario and New York State. It preserves fossils dating back to the Silurian period.  It is named after the city of City of Lockport, New York, where the Erie Canal cuts through and exposes beds of dolomite.

See also

 List of fossiliferous stratigraphic units in Ontario

References
 

Silurian Ontario
Silurian southern paleotemperate deposits